Porcine epidemic diarrhea is a condition caused by the porcine epidemic diarrhea virus that leads to severe gastrointestinal disease in pigs.

It is closely related to the agent responsible for transmissible gastroenteritis in pigs. Piglets are most susceptible to the disease, as are young adults during periods of stress. Transmission is via the fecal-oral route.


Signs and symptoms
In adult swine, the disease is very mild and mortality is rare. The primary signs are a watery diarrhea and mild systemic signs such as pyrexia, anorexia and lethargy.

Diagnosis
Diagnosis is via immunofluorescence or immunohistochemistry, and ELISA can detect antigen or antibodies.

Treatment and control
Treatment is symptomatic and aims to prevent dehydration in young pigs, using products such as electrolyte and energy supplements. Good biosecurity protocols such as adequate quarantine, isolation of cases, and disinfection help prevent entry or spread of the disease in the herd. In Canada, the Canadian Swine Health Board developed detailed protocols on how to adequately  disinfect transportation vehicles for live hogs and ensure the quality of the disinfection protocol.

References
 Porcine Epidemic Diarrhoea expert reviewed and published by WikiVet accessed 09/10/2011.
 Porcine Epidemic Diarrhea - Merck Veterinary Manual

Swine diseases
Coronavirus-associated diseases